Adriana Prosenjak (born 12 July 1963) is a Croatian former handball coach and player.

Considered a legendary player and a celebrated name in Croatian handball, she was the goalkeeper and the first captain of the Croatia women's national handball team. She was named the best handball player in Croatia in 1993.

Biography
She was born on July 7, 1963 in Labin, Istria. She started playing at 10 for her hometown club ŽRK Rudar Labin, and went through all the selections at the Istrian club. With Labin's first team, she managed to get promoted to the Yugoslav First League.

After playing for the swans, she moved to ŽRK Lokomotiva Zagreb. At Lokomotiva she won the EHF European League and the last Yugoslav Championship before the dissolution of the country. She spent 11 years at Lokomotiva, where she also won a Croatian Championship and a Croatian Cup in 1992. She then moved to Sweden and Austria and ended her career at ŽRK Đurđevac, where she started her coaching career.

After Đurđevac, she coached Varaždin, Salerno, Pula, Umag, and, from 2013 to 2019, ŽRK Zamet, winning two Croatian Cups and finishing second in the 2014–15 1 HRL. In 2020, she came back to her hometown Labin, to coach the local Labin School of Handball.

She also played for Croatia, of which she was the captain ever since the national team's first international appearance. She took part with Croatia in two World Championships and two European championships. She won the 1993 Mediterranean Games with Croatia. She played a total of 45 games for Croatia's national team.

References

Croatian female handball players
Yugoslav female handball players
Living people
People from Labin
1963 births